César Yauri Huanay (born 1962 in Ahuaycha District, Peru) is a Peruvian painter.

References

External links
Award, exhibitions, and distinctions

1962 births
Living people
Peruvian painters
Peruvian male painters